St Paul's College is an independent Roman Catholic co-educational secondary day school, located in West Kempsey, New South Wales, Australia.  The school caters for students in Year 7 to Year 12.

History
St. Paul's College Kempsey was established in 1965 after 30 years of planning. Classes commenced at St. Paul’s on the 8th of February, 1965, with 87 boys from classes 5, 6 and 1st form. In 1968 the school was established for students from Year 5 to fourth form.

In 1973 St Pius X Regional High School was built on the eastern side of the St Paul's site. The two schools were administered separately but shared a library and other facilities. In 1980 the two schools were amalgamated and became Macleay Regional Catholic High School. In 1985, the name of the school was reverted back to its original name, St. Paul’s College, and the motto "Let Your Light Shine" was adopted.

1991 marked the first Year 11 students and in 2000 the first four stream Year 7 class began.

School badge
The badge incorporates features of the former St Pius X and St Paul's badges. A shield with two tone blue and the Macleay Valley. In the upper right section there is a small replica of the St Paul's badge with the Chi Rho, the Southern Cross and Mary's emblem.

Sport houses
At St Paul's College there are four sporting houses:

Notable achievements 

 Australian Training Awards – School Pathways to VET Award, 2020
 First place HSC Investigating Science, 2020

Notable school community members
Joe Robinson, Guitarist and winner of Australia's Got Talent, Season 2. Former student of St Paul's
Albert Kelly, Rugby League player. Kelly also attended Patrician Brothers' College Blacktown
Aiden Tolman, Rugby League player

See also

 List of Catholic schools in New South Wales
 Catholic education in Australia

References

1965 establishments in Australia
Catholic secondary schools in New South Wales
Educational institutions established in 1965